The 2004 UEFA Champions League final was an association football match played on 26 May 2004 to decide the winner of the 2003–04 UEFA Champions League. AS Monaco, a Monaco-based club representing the French Football Federation, faced Portuguese side Porto at the Arena AufSchalke in Gelsenkirchen, Germany. Porto won the match 3–0, with Carlos Alberto, Deco and Dmitri Alenichev scoring the goals. Deco was named Man of the Match.

Porto's previous triumph in the competition had been in 1987 – although they had won the UEFA Cup in the previous season – while Monaco were playing in their first ever UEFA Champions League final. Both teams started their campaigns in the group stage and defeated former European champions on their way to the final: Porto beat 1968 and 1999 winners Manchester United while Monaco defeated nine-time champions Real Madrid.

Both teams were considered underdogs in the competition before reaching the final stages and were led by young managers. Monaco had hired former France national football team star Didier Deschamps as manager and Porto were led by rising star José Mourinho, who left the club for Chelsea a week after the match.

Monaco became the second team representing France to reach the Champions League final after Olympique de Marseille. Marseille lost their first appearance in the 1991 final, but triumphed two years later, defeating Milan. This was the fifth final in the history of the European Cup in which neither of the teams came from England, Germany, Italy or Spain, and the first since the 1991 final when Red Star Belgrade of Yugoslavia beat Marseille.

Background

Monaco
Monaco finished second in the French Ligue 1 the previous season, meaning that they entered the Champions League at the group stage. Monaco were placed in Group C, alongside Deportivo La Coruña, PSV and AEK Athens. After a 2–1 in their first win in the Netherlands and a 4–0 win at the Stade Louis II against AEK Athens, Monaco travelled to Spain, losing 1–0 by Deportivo. The Monegasque adventure really began after the return match against Deportivo, when Monaco won 8–3, which represented the highest number of goals in one match in the history of the new version of the UEFA Champions League; this record lasted until 22 November 2016, when Legia Warsaw lost 8–4 to Borussia Dortmund. Croatian striker Dado Pršo scored four times, while captain Ludovic Giuly (2), Jérôme Rothen, Jaroslav Plašil and Édouard Cissé pulverised the Spanish defensive line. After two more draws against PSV and AEK Athens, Monaco finished at the top of Group C.

The first knockout round saw Monaco winning against Lokomotiv Moscow after a 2–1 defeat in Russia and a win 1–0 at Stade Louis II. In the quarter-finals, Monaco played Real Madrid. After a 4–2 loss in Madrid (where Fernando Morientes scored, and was applauded by his former fans), Monaco created a sensation by defeating the Spanish 3–1 at home. Monaco played against Chelsea in the semi-finals, and despite the exclusion of Akis Zikos, Monaco found enough strength to score twice and win the game 3–1. The last goal was scored by striker Shabani Nonda, who just returned from a seven-month injury. The second leg at Stamford Bridge saw Monaco resisting Chelsea's strikes, for a final score of 2–2 to reach the European Cup final for the first time in their history.

Porto
Porto, winners of the Primeira Liga, Taça de Portugal and UEFA Cup in 2002–03, were the only Portuguese team in the group stage, after the elimination of Benfica in the third qualifying round by Italian side Lazio. Porto was drawn in Group F, along with Real Madrid, Marseille and Partizan. Porto's first match was at Partizan Stadium in Belgrade. Costinha scored the opening goal on 22 minutes, but Andrija Delibašić scored the equaliser on 54 minutes. The next match, the first at the Estádio das Antas, was a 3–1 loss to Real Madrid. Costinha scored the opening goal again, on seven minutes. Iván Helguera equalised on 28 minutes; Santiago Solari on 37 minutes and Zinedine Zidane on 67 scored Real Madrid's winning goals.

Three straight wins secured Porto's place in the first knockout round before the last match of the group stage, a draw in Madrid. In the first knockout round, Porto met Manchester United. The Portuguese won 2–1 at home and managed to qualify in the final minutes of the second leg, when Costinha scored an equaliser in injury time in a 1–1 draw at Old Trafford. In the quarter-finals, Porto met a French team for the second time in the tournament: a 2–0 win at home and a 2–2 draw in France eliminated Lyon from the competition. In the semi-finals, Porto played Deportivo La Coruña, eliminating them 1–0 on aggregate.

Route to the final

Match

Summary
Monaco, in their first European final since the 1992 Cup Winners Cup final, were up against Porto, the UEFA Cup winners from the previous season, who were appearing in the European Cup final for a second time, after defeating Bayern Munich in the 1987 European Cup final. Porto were the favourites after eliminating Manchester United and Deportivo La Coruña in the knockout phase, while Monaco had eliminated Real Madrid and Chelsea.

Details

Statistics

See also
2003–04 UEFA Champions League
2004 UEFA Cup Final
2004 UEFA Super Cup
2004 Intercontinental Cup
AS Monaco FC in European football
FC Porto in international football competitions

References

External links
Official website (archive)

Final
UEFA Champions League finals
European Cup Final 2004
European Cup Final 2004
2003–04 in French football
2003–04 in Portuguese football
Sports competitions in Gelsenkirchen
21st century in Gelsenkirchen
May 2004 sports events in Europe
2000s in North Rhine-Westphalia